Diplobatis is a genus of electric rays in the family Narcinidae.

Species
 Diplobatis colombiensis Fechhelm & McEachran, 1984 (Colombian electric ray)
 Diplobatis guamachensis Martín Salazar, 1957 (Brownband numbfish)
 Diplobatis ommata (D. S. Jordan & C. H. Gilbert, 1890) (Ocellated electric ray)
 Diplobatis pictus G. Palmer, 1950 (Painted electric ray)

References 
 

 
Narcinidae
Ray genera
Taxa named by Henry Bryant Bigelow
Taxa named by William Charles Schroeder
Taxonomy articles created by Polbot